Karma Deleg Chö Phel Ling is a vihara (a Buddhist monastery) near the Dutch village of Hantum (Friesland).

The monastery was founded in 1986 by Chödje Lama Gawang Rinpoche. Since 1993 the complex has its own stupa with a cloister and prayer wheels around it.

Tibetan Buddhist temples
Religious buildings and structures in the Netherlands
Buildings and structures in Friesland